Pitepalt (see palt) is a Swedish dish related to kroppkakor or meat-filled dumplings. It is especially associated with the city of Piteå  in Norrbotten County,  thought to be its place of origin.

Varieties
This dish has many varieties. Pitepalt are mostly made of raw potatoes and a mix of wheat and barley flour. Pitepalt and kroppkaka look quite similar in shape. For kroppkaka, pre-boiled potatoes and wheat flour are used. This gives kroppkaka  dumplings  a slightly lighter color.

Ingredients
Potatoes, wheat flour or barley flour, salt and pork are common ingredients in pitepalt. Some recipes also mention onions but this is uncommon.

Serving
This dish is traditionally eaten with butter and lingonberry jam.

See also

Baozi (steamed)
Buuz
Chuchvara
Jiaozi (fried)
Kalduny
Kartoffelklösse
Khinkali
Kreplach
Mandu
Manti
Maultasche
Momo
Pelmeni
Pierogi
Ravioli
Shishbarak
Siopao
Tortellini
Vareniki
Wonton

References

Swedish cuisine
Dumplings
Piteå
Potato dishes
Barley-based dishes